Via Brasil Linhas Aéreas was a Brazilian charter airline founded in 1999. It ceased operations in 2002.

History 
Via Brasil was an airline established in 1999 to operate charter flights between Southeast and Northeast regions of Brazil. In 2002, due to technical problems related to its sole aircraft, the company was grounded and finally closed.

Destinations 
Via Brasil served the following destinations:

Fortaleza – Pinto Martins International Airport
João Pessoa – Presidente Castro Pinto International Airport
Natal – Augusto Severo International Airport
Porto Seguro – Porto Seguro Airport
Recife – Guararapes/Gilberto Freyre International Airport
Rio de Janeiro – Galeão/Antonio Carlos Jobim International Airport
São Paulo – Guarulhos/Governador André Franco Montoro International Airport

Fleet

Airline affinity program 
Via Brasil did not have an airline affinity program.

See also 
List of defunct airlines of Brazil

References

External links 
Via Brasil Photo Archive at airliners.net

Defunct airlines of Brazil
Airlines established in 1999
Airlines disestablished in 2002
1999 establishments in Brazil